The Adroit Journal is an American literary magazine founded in November 2010. Published five times per year by founding editor Peter LaBerge, the journal was produced with the support of the University of Pennsylvania's Kelly Writers House from 2013 to 2017, was based in the San Francisco Bay Area from 2017 to 2019, and is currently based in the greater New York City area.

Contributors and staff 
Authors featured in The Adroit Journal include Terrance Hayes, Franny Choi, Ned Vizzini, Alex Dimitrov, Lydia Millet, Chen Chen, Ocean Vuong, Danez Smith, Fatimah Asghar, Bob Hicok, Natalie Shapero, D. A. Powell, Laura Kasischke, Kaveh Akbar, Dorianne Laux, Randall Mann, Brynne Rebele-Henry, Phillip B. Williams, and Hieu Minh Nguyen.

Previous or current staff members of The Adroit Journal include Anthony Veasna So, Leila Chatti, Aria Aber, Lisa Hiton, Talin Tahajian, Isabella Nilsson, Nkosi Nkululeko, Alexa Derman, Sarah Fletcher, Amanda Silberling, Jaclyn Grimm, Jim Whiteside, Rhodes Scholars Russell Bogue and Aaron Robertson, and Michele Selene Ang of 13 Reasons Why.

Anthology and press presence 
Pieces from the journal have been selected for inclusion in The Best American Poetry, Best New Poets, The Best American Nonrequired Reading, Verse Daily, Poetry Daily, and Best of the Net, and have been awarded the Pushcart Prize.

A video recording of Jim Parsons reading Max McDonough's poem "Egg Harbor", originally published in The Adroit Journal, was featured by The New York Times in February 2018.

The Adroit Journal Summer Mentorship Program 
The Adroit Journal Summer Mentorship Program is a free, online program that pairs experienced writers with high school and secondary students. Mentees have been recognized through the National YoungArts Foundation & United States Presidential Scholar in the Arts designation, the National Scholastic Art & Writing Awards, and the Foyle Young Poet of the Year Awards. Participants have also been featured in Teen Vogue and NPR, among other publications.

The Gregory Djanikian Scholars Program 
Gregory Djanikian was born in Alexandria, Egypt, and came to the United States when he was eight years old. He has published seven poetry collections, the latest of which is Sojourners of the In-Between (CMU Press, 2020). The Djanikian Scholars Program recognizes six emerging writers each year, beginning with 2018.

The Adroit Prizes for Poetry and Prose 
The Adroit Prizes are awarded annually to two students of secondary or undergraduate status "whose written work inspires the masses to believe beyond feeling the work."

References

External links

2010 establishments in California
Online literary magazines published in the United States
Magazines established in 2010
Magazines published in the San Francisco Bay Area
Magazines published in New York City
Quarterly magazines published in the United States